Roscoe Dixon (September 20, 1949 – April 15, 2021) was an American politician in the state of Tennessee. Dixon lived in Memphis, Tennessee and was involved with the public relations business. He served in the Tennessee House of Representatives from 1978 to 1994 and in the Tennessee Senate from 1994 to 2005. He was arrested and charged in Operation Tennessee Waltz in 2005. Dixon was sentenced to 5 years and 3 months in prison on corruption charges. He died at the age of 71 on April 15, 2021, in a hospital, in Memphis, Tennessee.

References

Democratic Party members of the Tennessee House of Representatives
1949 births
2021 deaths
Democratic Party Tennessee state senators
African-American state legislators in Tennessee
American public relations people
People from Crittenden County, Arkansas
Politicians from Memphis, Tennessee
Tennessee politicians convicted of crimes
20th-century African-American people
21st-century African-American people

Prisoners and detainees of the United States federal government